Cupaniopsis wadsworthii, sometimes commonly named duckfoot and scrub tuckeroo, is an Australian species of shrubs of the flowering plant family Sapindaceae. The grow naturally in rainforests and seasonally dry rainforests, noted as usually "on hill slopes in rocky soil", from Magnetic Island southwards to about Bulburin National Park, central eastern Queensland.

Description 

The leaves are pinnate and alternate with four or eight leaflets. The leaflets form a distinctive triangular shape, broad at the tip and terminating in a point at the petiole. In many plants, the broad apex carries two outer and one inner points, producing a pattern similar to the webbing between the toes of waterbirds, and giving rise the common name duckfoot.

The fruits are orange to yellow capsules with three lobes. Inside each lobe there is a glossy dark brown seed. Each seed is covered in a bright orange aril. Fruits ripen from October to December, attracting many birds.

References

External links
 Cupaniopsis wadsworthii

wadsworthii
Sapindales of Australia
Trees of Australia
Flora of Queensland
Taxa named by Ferdinand von Mueller